Groupe SERPORT, GROUPE SERVICES PORTUAIRES, It is an Algerian government port management company.

History
On May 13, 2022 The CEO of the port management company (Groupe SERPORT) Achour Djelloul, was dismissed from his post after the scandal of the exit of containers of Hyundai cars imported by the Tahkout company in 2019. a judicial inquiry has been opened into the case of the exit and transfer from the commercial port of Mostaganem, in violation of the law, of 311 containers containing 1,064 disassembled cars, reports the Algeria Press Service citing the prosecution at the Mostaganem court. and replaced by the former CEO of the port company of annaba (EPAN), Abdelkarim Harkati who would have been appointed interim director of serport.

Ports operated
 Entreprise Portuaire d'ALGER
 Entreprise Portuaire de BÉJAIA
 Entreprise Portuaire d' ANNABA
 Entreprise Portuaire d'ORAN
 Entreprise portuaire de SKIKDA
 Entreprise Portuaire d'ARZEW
 Entreprise portuaire de GHAZAOUET
 Entreprise portuaire de TÉNÈS
 Entreprise portuaire de DJENDJEN
 Entreprise portuaire de MOSTAGANEM
 Entreprise Portuaire de CHERCHELL
 Société de Gestion des Ports de Pêche

USM Alger
On March 2, 2020, it was announced that Groupe SERPORT had bought the shares of ETRHB Haddad which amounted to 94.34%. in a press conference Halim Hammoudi, Secretary General of SERPORT announced that Aïn Benian project and the club headquarters will be launched soon. He also said that the goal is to achieve continental titles, not only local ones. Previously Achur Djelloul general manager of SERPORT, said they would invest between 1,2 and 1,3 billion dinar per year, while the training center project will cost 1,4 billion dinar. On May 13, 2020, Achur Djelloul announced that he signed with Antar Yahia to be the new Sporting director for three years and Abdelghani Haddi as a new general manager. On July 31, 2020, Abdelghani Haddi spoke about some newspapers and responded to them and the fake news about the value of buying USM Alger's shares, where he said that the amount was 2 billion dinars about 13 million euros, for information SERPORT is a holding company which manages the State's holdings in Algerian port services. It generates a turnover of nearly 500 million euros per year, for a net profit which oscillates between 25 and 40 million euros. On March 15, 2021, the construction works of USM Alger's training center were officially launched, central technical director and production Rachid Douh stated that the plot contains 30,000 square meters, and will house the club's headquarters two playgrounds inside the hall two changing rooms and two playgrounds with artificial grass. The works will be carried out by EPE Batimetal, Asked on National Radio about a possible withdrawal from Groupe SERPORT, Achour Djelloul assured that the public company had no intention of separating from USM Alger.

References

External links
 Official Groupe SERPORT website

Government-owned companies of Algeria
Companies based in Algiers
USM Alger